Francisco Javier "Javi" García-Noblejas Hernanz (born 18 March 1993) is a Spanish footballer who plays as a left back.

Career
On 20 August 2018, after terminating his contract with Rayo Vallecano, Noblejas signed for Sporting de Gijón.

References

External links

1993 births
Living people
Footballers from Madrid
Spanish footballers
Spanish expatriate footballers
Association football defenders
La Liga players
Segunda División players
Segunda División B players
Tercera División players
Eerste Divisie players
Real Madrid C footballers
Real Madrid Castilla footballers
Getafe CF B players
Getafe CF footballers
Elche CF players
Albacete Balompié players
Rayo Vallecano players
Córdoba CF players
Sporting de Gijón players
NAC Breda players
Spain youth international footballers
Spanish expatriate sportspeople in the Netherlands
Expatriate footballers in the Netherlands